Emadabad (also Romanized as ‘Emādābād) is a village in Mahmudabad-e Seyyed Rural District, in the Central District of Sirjan County, Kerman Province, Iran. At the 2006 census, its population was 702, in 166 families.

References 

Populated places in Sirjan County